Stephen Joseph Reichert (14 May 1943) is a Roman Catholic archbishop-emeritus.

Born in Leoville, Kansas, United States, Reichert was ordained to the priesthood for the Capuchin order on 27 September 1969. On 3 February 1995, Reichert was appointed bishop of the Roman Catholic Diocese of Mendi, Papua New Guinea and was ordained a bishop on 7 May 1995. He was then appointed archbishop of the Roman Catholic Archdiocese of Madang, Papua New Guinea on 30 November 2010. The proposal of archbishop's coat of arms (redesign) created by Marek Sobola, a heraldic artist from Slovakia.

Reichert resignation upon having reached the age limit was accepted on 26 July 2019.

Notes

External links

1943 births
Living people
People from Decatur County, Kansas
Capuchin bishops
American Roman Catholic priests
21st-century Roman Catholic archbishops in Papua New Guinea
Catholics from Kansas
Roman Catholic archbishops of Madang
Roman Catholic bishops of Mendi
American expatriate bishops